The Asab Oil Field is an oil field in Abu Dhabi. It was discovered in 1965 and developed by Abu Dhabi National Oil Company. This oil field is operated and owned by Abu Dhabi National Oil Company.

References 

Oil fields of the United Arab Emirates